The 2004 Indian general election in Jammu and Kashmir to the 14th Lok Sabha were held for 6 seats. Jammu and Kashmir National Conference won 2 seats, Indian National Congress won 2, Jammu and Kashmir Peoples Democratic Party won one seat and one was won by an Independent politician Thupstan Chhewang from Ladakh.

Constituency Details

Results

Party-wise Results

List of Elected MPs

Runners Up

See also 

 Elections in Jammu and Kashmir

References 

Jammu
Indian general elections in Jammu and Kashmir
2000s in Jammu and Kashmir